17 Camelopardalis is a single star in the northern circumpolar constellation of Camelopardalis, located roughly 960 light years away from the Sun. It is visible to the naked eye as a faint, red-hued star with an apparent visual magnitude of 5.44. This object is moving closer to the Earth with a heliocentric radial velocity of −20 km/s.

This is an ageing red giant star, currently on the asymptotic giant branch, with a stellar classification of M1IIIa. It is a suspected small amplitude variable.

References

M-type giants
Suspected variables
Camelopardalis (constellation)
BD+62 0759
Camelopardalis,17
035583
025769
1802